Roman Pivarník (born 17 February 1967) is a Slovakian football manager and former player. Pivarník's playing career included a stint at SK Sigma Olomouc, which included matches in the inaugural season of the Czech First League. He played 17 matches and scored twice over the course of the season.

Coaching career
Pivarník signed a two-year deal to take over at Czech First League club Olomouc in the summer of 2012. He oversaw the club's victory in the Czech Supercup in 2012 but id not last for the whole season, as he was replaced by assistant manager Martin Kotůlek following a poor run of results in May 2013, with the club lying in fourth place in the league.

Honours

Player
Dukla Prague
Czechoslovak Cup: 1989–90

Rapid Wien
Austrian Football Bundesliga: 1995–96 
Austrian Cup: 1995
UEFA Cup Winners' Cup runner-Up: 1995–96

Manager
Tatran Prešov
Slovak Second Liga: 2007–08

Sigma Olomouc
Czech Supercup: 2012

References

1967 births
Living people
Czechoslovak footballers
Slovak footballers
FK Dukla Banská Bystrica players
Czech First League players
FK Dukla Prague players
SK Sigma Olomouc players
SK Rapid Wien players
Bnei Yehuda Tel Aviv F.C. players
FC Carl Zeiss Jena players
Austrian Football Bundesliga players
Sportspeople from Košice
Slovak football managers
Slovak Super Liga managers
1. FC Tatran Prešov managers
Czech First League managers
SK Sigma Olomouc managers
FC Vysočina Jihlava managers
1. HFK Olomouc managers
FC Zbrojovka Brno managers
Czech expatriate footballers
Czech footballers
Expatriate footballers in Austria
Expatriate footballers in Israel
Expatriate footballers in Germany
Czech expatriate sportspeople in Austria
Czech expatriate sportspeople in Israel
Czech expatriate sportspeople in Germany
Expatriate football managers in Austria
Expatriate football managers in Saudi Arabia
Czech expatriate sportspeople in Saudi Arabia
Association football midfielders
FC Fastav Zlín managers
Al Tadhamon SC managers
Czech expatriate sportspeople in Kuwait
Expatriate football managers in Kuwait
Kuwait Premier League managers